France was represented by Catherine Ferry, with the song "Un, deux, trois", at the 1976 Eurovision Song Contest, which took place on 3 April in The Hague.

Before Eurovision

National final 
Broadcaster TF1 opted to choose their 1976 entry via public selection. Two semi-finals were held, followed by the final on 29 February.

Semi-finals
Each semi-final contained seven songs, with the top three in each going forward to the final. The qualifiers were chosen by public televoting.

Final
The final took place on 29 February 1976, hosted by Evelyn Leclercq, Enrico Macias and Demis Roussos. Again the winner was chosen by public televoting

At Eurovision 
On the night of the final Ferry performed 17th in the running order, following Monaco and preceding Yugoslavia. France had rarely taken the Eurovision route of uptempo, bouncy and lyrically unchallenging pop songs, but had done so with "Un, deux, trois". Prior to the contest most observers noted that the 1976 contest was the easiest for many years to predict, with "Un, deux, trois" and the United Kingdom's "Save Your Kisses for Me" as the only possible winners. The predictions proved accurate as the two quickly surged well ahead of the field in the voting, and after half the national juries had given their votes France held the lead by 82 points to the United Kingdom's 77. However the United Kingdom scored the stronger in the second half, and ran out the winner with 164 points to France's 147. However "Un, deux, trois" finished a huge 55 points ahead of third-placed Monaco. "Un, deux, trois" had picked up five maximum 12s (from Austria, Germany, Monaco, the Netherlands and Yugoslavia) and gained the distinction of becoming the first ever non-winning Eurovision song to pick up points from every other national jury. In terms of points received as a percentage of the maximum possible total (72.06%) it remains the most successful runner-up ever under the 12 points system and outranks most subsequent winners.

The French jury awarded its 12 points to Portugal.

Voting

References 

1976
Countries in the Eurovision Song Contest 1976
Eurovision